Trochosa robusta is a cellar spider species with Palearctic distribution. It is common in Germany and Poland. It remained unobserved, despite its considerable size, in Denmark until recently, where it was sighted on the island of Bornholm.

See also
 List of Lycosidae species

References

External links

Lycosidae
Spiders of Europe
Palearctic spiders
Spiders described in 1876